Kolodeyevka is a rural locality (a selo) and the administrative center of Kolodeyevskoye Rural Settlement, Buturlinovsky District, Voronezh Oblast, Russia. The population was 530 as of 2010. There are 4 streets.

Geography 
Kolodeyevka is located 38 km east of Buturlinovka (the district's administrative centre) by road. Kucheryayevka is the nearest rural locality.

References 

Rural localities in Buturlinovsky District